Richard Smart (born 6 March 1945 in Windsor, New South Wales) is an Australian viticulturalist and leading global consultant on viticulture methods, who is often referred to as "the flying vine-doctor". He is considered responsible for revolutionising grape growing due to his work on canopy management techniques.

Biography
Smart is a graduate from Sydney University with honours in agricultural science in 1966. Additionally he holds the degrees MSc (Hons) from Macquarie University following a study of sunlight use by vineyards, a PhD from Cornell University in New York State studying under the Professor Nelson Shaulis, and in 1995 awarded a D.Sc. in agriculture by the Stellenbosch University, South Africa, in recognition of research into canopy management effects on vineyard yield and quality.

Smart is the developer of the Smart-Dyson Trellis, a modification of the Scott Henry trellis, with curtains trained up and down from the one cordon, along with John Dyson of California.

Smart is the author of the book Sunlight into Wine as well as a contributor to several trade publications, and the viticulture editor of The Oxford Companion to Wine.

Global warming changes
Smart has warned that as a consequence of the ongoing ramifications of global warming, there will be a variety of effects on viticulture, among which that some red grape varieties may lose colour, some wines will lose varietal flavor, some white varieties may disappear.
He has also warned of the consequent dangers of vine infestation as temperatures rise, particularly in the case of the glassy-winged sharpshooter, vector of Pierce's Disease, and the aphid Hyalestes obsoletus, which spreads a phytoplasma disease Bois Noir. Higher temperatures mean both insects will be able to survive winters and move further. Hyalestes obsoletus has recently been found in German vines.

Furthermore, he has stated that following the Earth's changes, China is set to come to prominence as a wine-producing region.

See also
List of wine personalities

References

 Richard Smart bio smartvit.com.au

Footnotes

External links
Smart Viticulture official site
"Terroir Unmasked", Dr. Smart article, Wine Business Monthly

Living people
Cornell University College of Agriculture and Life Sciences alumni
Australian viticulturists
1945 births